Gazond may refer to:
 Gazond, Razavi Khorasan
 Gazond, Sistan and Baluchestan
 Gazond, South Khorasan